The League of Ireland Cup 2005 was the 32nd staging of the League of Ireland Cup.

The 2005 League Cup kicked off in May. A representative team of the Mayo League joined the 22 league clubs in the draw.  There were fourteen clubs drawn to face each other in the first round, with the rest given byes to the second round.

First round
Matches played on 30 May and 31 May 2005.

Second round
Matches played between 20 June and 26 June 2005.

Quarter-finals
Matches played on 4 July and 5 July 2005.

Semi-finals

Final

External links
2005 Season in Ireland on rsssf website
2005 League Cup on FAI website

League of Ireland Cup seasons
3
Cup